Janez Matjašič (14 May 1921 – 9 August 1996) was a Slovene zoologist.

Matjašič was an associate member of the Slovenian Academy of Sciences and Arts from 1974 and a full member from 1989.

Apart from scientific contributions he also wrote two popular science books Nevidno življenje (Invisible Life) and Iz življenja najmanjših (From the Lives of the Smallest). For the latter he won the Levstik Award in 1956.

References 

1921 births
1996 deaths
Slovenian zoologists
Scientists from Ljubljana
Levstik Award laureates
Members of the Slovenian Academy of Sciences and Arts
Yugoslav zoologists